Harat Bar (also Romanized as Harāt Bar) is a Eco-friendly village in Owshiyan  (Oshiyan) اوشیان district, Chaboksar city چابکسر, Gilan Province, Iran. It is located south to Caspian sea and north to Alborz mountain. Distance between sea and mountain in this area is 1300 meters. At the 2006 census, its population was 207, in 63 families.

References 

Populated places in Rudsar County